Kuželov is a municipality and village in Hodonín District in the South Moravian Region of the Czech Republic. It has about 400 inhabitants.

Sights
Kuželov is known for a windmill, protected as a national cultural monument. It dates from 1842. It is a rare example of preserved Holland-type windmill. After the reconstruction, the mill is functional again and its interior houses an exposition about milling and life in the Horňácko region.

References

Villages in Hodonín District
Horňácko